Atash Sara (also Romanized as Ātash Sarā and Ātashsarā) is a village in Lat Leyl Rural District, Otaqvar District, Langarud County, Gilan Province, Iran. At the 2006 census, its population was 40, in 11 families.

References 

Populated places in Langarud County